August Daniel Wiera (28 March 1853 Jaama manor, near Tartu – 26 March 1919 Tartu) was an Estonian theatre and music personnel. Under his guidance Vanemuine Cultural Society's theatre collective became semi-professional.

With August's help the Estonian theater became Semi-Professional and grew the group membership to one hundred.

1878 he become the head of Vanemuine Cultural Society. Until 1903 he worked at Vanemuine Cultural Society. Until 1913 he worked mostly at Bürgermusse.

He was the first in Estonia who introduce the new genre: music theatre.

Works

 Jannsen' "Pärmi-Jago unenägu" (1873)
 Kivi's "Viru Villemi viimne otsus" (1887)
 Conrad's "Õunapuu all" (1887)

References

1853 births
1919 deaths
Estonian theatre directors
19th-century Estonian musicians
20th-century Estonian musicians
People from Tartu